Bestair (Bestair Havayollari) was a charter airline based in Yeşilköy, Istanbul, Turkey. It was a privately owned charter airline operating domestic and international services. Its main bases were Atatürk International Airport, Istanbul and Antalya Airport.

History 
The airline started operations on 17 June 2006. It was established by the Tunca Group (airline Chief Executive: Bahtisen Tunca).

Bestair ceased its operations in October 2009.

Destinations 
Bestair operated services linking Istanbul and Antalya with destinations in Germany, Belgium, Switzerland and the United Kingdom.

Fleet 

The Bestair fleet included the following aircraft (as of 6 May 2009)
2 Airbus A321-131 (one aircraft was operated for Atlasjet)
1 McDonnell Douglas MD-82 (which was operated for Mahan Air)

As of 6 May 2009, the average age of the Bestair fleet was 16.2 years

See also 
 List of defunct airlines of Turkey

References

External links

Bestair (Archive) 
Bestair Fleet

Defunct airlines of Turkey
Airlines established in 2006
Airlines disestablished in 2009
Defunct charter airlines of Turkey